Paula Beer (born 23 February 1995 in Mainz) is a German actress. She first became known as a teenager for her main role in Chris Kraus' 2010 film Poll. Her breakthrough was in 2016, when she starred in François Ozon's Frantz (2016), for which she won the Marcello Mastroianni Award for best young performer at the 73rd Venice International Film Festival. She won the Silver Bear for Best Actress at the 70th Berlin International Film Festival for her performance as Undine Wibeau in Christian Petzold's Undine.

Filmography

References

External links

 
 

1995 births
21st-century German actresses
European Film Award for Best Actress winners
German film actresses
German television actresses
Living people
Marcello Mastroianni Award winners
Actors from Mainz
Silver Bear for Best Actress winners